The Joan Rivers Show is an American talk show hosted by comedian Joan Rivers that premiered on September 5, 1989, in broadcast syndication. The show aired for five seasons, and ended in December 1993. The show was nominated for numerous Emmy Awards, with Rivers winning the Daytime Emmy Award for Outstanding Talk Show Host in 1990. The series was produced by PGHM Productions, Joan Rivers's production company, in association with Tribune Entertainment, and distributed by Paramount Domestic Television for its first season and Tribune Entertainment for its final three seasons.

In the mid-1990s the show was repeated on E! for several months. Repeats aired on the Decades TV network from January to August 2019, and as of January 2021 128 episodes were available for free streaming on the Vidmark app, and the Roku Channel on the Roku store.

Rivers had previously hosted a late-night talk show entitled The Late Show with Joan Rivers, which dropped her as the host in May 1987.

Episodes
While over 900 episodes exist, here is a list of the 128 episodes available on Roku:

 Sept. 8, 1989: Kim Novak, Marvin Hamlisch
 Sept. 12, 1989: Donna Mills, Rain Pryor
 Sept. 22, 1989: Bob Hope, Candida Royalle
 Sept. 26, 1989: Boy George, Joy Behar
 Sept. 27, 1989: Leslie Uggams, Roxanne Pulitzer, Paul Linke
 Oct. 3, 1989: Geraldo Rivera
 Oct. 16, 1989: Malcolm Forbes
 Oct. 17, 1989: John Travolta, Sugar Ray Leonard, Richard Simmons
 Oct. 18, 1989: Pamela Des Barres, Barbara Gardner Proctor, Adrien Arpel (aka. Adrienne Arpel)
 Oct. 23, 1989: Roddy McDowall
 Oct. 26, 1989: Anthony Quinn, Renée Taylor, Joseph Bologna
 Nov. 1, 1989: Elizabeth Ashley, Virginia Graham, Paul Peterson, Angela Cartwright, Stanley Livingston
 Nov. 2, 1989: Whoopi Goldberg
 Nov. 6, 1989: Joan Van Ark, Howie Mandel
 Nov. 8, 1989: Pee Wee Herman, Larry Hagman, John Davidson, Shadoe Stevens
 Nov. 9, 1989: Jackée Harry, Peter Horton, Timothy Busfield, Melanie Mayron, Polly Draper, Marshall Herskovitz, Wolfgang Puck, Barbara Lazaroff
 Nov. 10, 1989: Little Richard, Jackie Collins, Mariette Hartley
 Nov. 13, 1989: Zsa Zsa Gabor, Faith Ford
 Nov. 15, 1989: Louie Anderson
 Nov. 16, 1989: Patti D'Arbanville
 Nov. 21, 1989: Malcolm-Jamal Warner, a prostitute, a lesbian nun, an obese woman, a female-impersonator
 Nov. 22, 1989: The Chippendales strippers, Robin Byrd, Ruth Westheimer (Dr. Ruth)
 Nov. 29, 1989: Debbie Reynolds, Martina Navratilova, Randy Crawford
 Dec. 4, 1989: Robert Klein, Linda Dano
 Dec. 6, 1989: Robin Leach
 Dec. 8, 1989: Ed Begley, Jr., Gloria Steinem
 Dec. 19, 1989: George Burns
 Dec. 20, 1989: David Hasselhoff, Diane Ladd
 Jan. 5, 1990: Brooke Shields, Herve Villechaize
 Jan. 10, 1990: Gary Coleman, Melissa Manchester
 Jan. 11, 1990: Mary Frann, Byron Allen
 Jan. 16, 1990: Betty White, porn stars Jerry Butler, Rebecca Steele, Charisma Arquette
 Jan. 17, 1990: Nancy Reagan, Steve Garvey and his wife Candace
 Jan. 30, 1990: Rita Moreno
 Feb. 6, 1990: George Foreman, The Disappearance of Johnny Gosch 
 Feb. 7, 1990: Robert Wuhl, Ana-Alicia
 Feb. 8, 1990: James Earl Jones, Women who underwent weight-loss procedures that failed
 Feb. 14, 1990: Nell Carter, unusual dating services for the handicapped, obese, and by astrology
 Feb. 15, 1990: John Lithgow, Stella Stevens, Dorothy Hamill, Clint Holmes
 Feb. 20, 1990: Marla Gibbs, David Brenner
 Feb. 21, 1990: Wayne Newton
 Feb. 23, 1990: Jessica Tandy, Sam Kinison
 Feb. 26, 1990: Rutger Hauer, Jan Hooks, Nora Dunn, Victoria Jackson
 March 6, 1990: Linda Gray
 March 8, 1990: Susan Saint James
 March 20, 1990: Jaclyn Smith
 March 23, 1990: Anthony Quinn and 3 of his children, Russian models
 March 30, 1990: Meredith Vieira, Kim Zimmer, Faith Daniels
 April 2, 1990: Billy Dee Williams, college hazing
 April 3, 1990: Paula Zahn, Harry Smith
 April 5, 1990: Lea Thompson, Cheryl Ladd, Ricki Lake, Dave Coulier, Nancy Wilson
 April 26, 1990: Lily Tomlin
 April 27, 1990: Dudley Moore
 April 30, 1990: Phil Donahue
 May 1, 1990: Eva Marie Saint
 May 3, 1990: Lou Diamond Phillips, Jerry Seinfeld, the sons of Billy Tipton, who was revealed to be transgendered after his death.
 May 4, 1990: Howard Stern, Angela Bowie
 May 7, 1990: Dom DeLuise
 May 8, 1990: Joan Chen, Russ Tamblyn, Dana Ashbrook, Jeff Bergman
 May 11, 1990: Roseanne Barr, Tom Arnold, Eddie Rabbit
 May 15, 1990: Eva Gabor, Todd Bridges, Danny Bonaduce, Paul Peterson
 May 18, 1990: Angie Dickinson
 May 21, 1990: Alex Rocco, Telma Hopkins, clips of Joan's final interview with Jill Ireland
 May 22, 1990: Alan Thicke, a police psychic, retired prostitutes
 May 24, 1990: Marla Maples, game show hosts Gene Rayburn, Peter Marshall, and Art Fleming
 June 4, 1990: Robby Benson and his wife Karla DeVito, Robert Picardo
 June 6, 1990: Jean LeClerc, Cree Summer, lyme disease, shoplifting, multiple sclerosis
 June 18, 1990: Janet Leigh
 July 17, 1990: Jane Pauley, a couple who stars in amateur porn videos
 July 19, 1990: Genie Francis, Elvis impersonators, cheating husbands
 July 23, 1990: Maury Povich, Alison Gertz discuses how she contracted AIDS
 Aug. 2, 1990: William Shatner, Rhonda Hansome, Dana Delaney, Louis Gossett Jr., coping with the death of a pet
 Sept. 11, 1990: Donna Mills, cousins who married each other
 Sept. 14, 1990: Bob Hope, Bobby Rivers, college campus murders
 Sept. 19, 1990: Florence Henderson, Robert Urich, Carol Kane, obese porn stars
 Sept. 20, 1990: Jane Seymour, Ashford & Simpson, near-death experiences, twins; when one is gay and the other is straight
 Sept. 24, 1990: Donald Trump
 Sept. 27, 1990: Valerie Harper
 Sept. 28, 1990: Raymond Burr, Rosa Parks, Placido Domingo, Rhonda Hansome
 Oct. 8, 1990: Judith Light, Jackie Collins, people who hired private investigators to stalk their loved ones
 Oct. 25, 1990: Randy Travis, Michael Feinstein, Dread Zeppelin, women terrorized over the phone
 Nov. 15, 1990: John Ritter, Richard Thomas, David Benoit performs with his jazz band
 Nov. 26, 1990: Bob Saget, George Carlin, Pat Robertson
 Jan. 31, 1991: Harry Smith and his wife Andrea Joyce, Florence Quivar
 Feb. 8, 1991: Debbie Gibson, Phoebe Legere, As the World Turns stars Andrew Kavovit, Michael David Morrison, and John Hensley
 Feb. 11, 1991: Jamie Lee Curtis, Holly Fulger
 Feb. 20, 1991: Richard Crenna, Deidre Hall, Brenda Lee
 March 6, 1991: Tom Eplin, Marc Summers, Richie Havens
 March 19, 1991: Joan Collins
 April 17, 1991: Tyne Daly, Shari Lewis, James Earl Jones
 April 24, 1991: gay men who date straight men
 Sept. 11, 1991: Gary Morton, Altovise Davis, Shirlee Fonda
 Phil Donahue, Donahue Childhood Friends, The Hollywood Kids, Who Can You Trust
 Joan Collins (1992)
 Kevin Dobson John James
 The Hollywood Kids, Robert Blake
 The Hollywood Kids, Tori Spelling, Brian Austin Green (1992)
 Classic sitcom stars Joyce DeWitt, Bob Denver, Robert Reed, Donna Douglas
 Tom Arnold, Roseanne Barr
 Jeffrey Lyons, Bobby Rydell, Martha Reeves, Tab Hunter
 I Love Lucy 40th Anniversary, John Michael Howson, Bart Andrews, Bob Schiller, Bob Weiskopf, Irma Kusely, Keith Thibodeaux, Desi Arnaz Jr.
 Jesse Nash, Della Reese, KaHo Foxx, LaWanda Page, Jackée
 Susan Lucci (1993)
 Julie Andrews, Ben Kingsley, Peabo Bryson

References

External links
 

1989 American television series debuts
1993 American television series endings
1980s American television talk shows
1990s American television talk shows
Fox Broadcasting Company original programming
Joan Rivers
Television series by Tribune Entertainment